The Accountant may refer to:

 The Accountant (magazine), accounting magazine published in the UK
 The Accountant (2001 film), winner of the Academy Award for Live Action Short Film
 The Accountant (2016 film), a thriller film starring Ben Affleck
 A character portrayed by William Fichtner, in the 2011 fantasy movie Drive Angry

See also
 Accountant, a practitioner of accounting